The Portsmouth trolleybus system once served the city of Portsmouth, Hampshire, England.

By the standards of the various now-defunct trolleybus systems in the United Kingdom, the Portsmouth system was a medium-sized one, with a total of nine routes, and a maximum fleet of 139 trolleybuses. The former trolleybus routes were replaced by diesel bus services.

Two of the former Portsmouth trolleybuses are now preserved, one (No. 313) at the East Anglia Transport Museum at Carlton Colville, Suffolk, and the other one (No. 1) at the CPPTD Museum, Wicor Farm, and Portchester as of 2014.

See also

History of Portsmouth
List of trolleybus systems in the United Kingdom

References

Notes

Further reading

External links

National Trolleybus Archive
British Trolleybus Society, based in Reading
National Trolleybus Association, based in London

Transport in Portsmouth
Portsmouth
Portsmouth